Enteromius trispilos is a species of ray-finned fish in the genus Enteromius that lives in West Africa.

References

External links
 

Enteromius
Freshwater fish of West Africa
Taxa named by Pieter Bleeker
Fish described in 1863